London Buses route 5 is a Transport for London contracted bus route in London, England. Running between Romford Market and Canning Town bus station, it is operated by Blue Triangle.

History

Route number 5 was used for an experimental service which ran between November 1953 and May 1954. The route, which ran from Shepherd's Bush Green to Ladbroke Grove, was withdrawn due to low ridership.

The current route 5 was introduced on 11 November 1959 as a replacement for trolleybus routes 567 and 665 between East Ham and Bloomsbury being operated by AEC Routemasters. On 17 April 1971 it was converted to one man operation with Daimler Fleetlines introduced.

Having been altered to operate between Becontree Heath bus station and Canning Town bus station, from privatisation it was operated by East London. On 25 March 2006 it was extended east to Romford Market replacing route 87. On 14 May 2011, the last AEC Routemaster, RML2760 built, operated a special service for charity on route 5 between Romford and Barking.

Upon being re-tendered it passed to Blue Triangle on 26 August 2017. On the same date it was altered in Romford to serve Queen's Hospital. It is operated out of River Road garage.

Current route
Route 5 operates via these primary locations:
Romford Market
Romford station   
Becontree Heath bus station
Barking station   
Upton Park
Plaistow
Canning Town bus station

References

External links

Bus routes in London
Transport in the London Borough of Barking and Dagenham
Transport in the London Borough of Havering
Transport in the London Borough of Newham